Mickey Cochrane Stadium is a soccer-specific stadium located in Bowling Green, Ohio. The stadium is home to the Bowling Green Falcons men's and women's varsity soccer teams. The field was named after Mickey Cochrane in 1980. The field was enclosed in 1993, and a scoreboard added in 1994, turning the field into a stadium.

References

Soccer venues in Ohio
Bowling Green Falcons men's soccer
College soccer venues in the United States